The 2019–20 Telekom S-League is the 16th season of the Telekom S-League, the top football league in the Solomon Islands.

The league kicked off on 14 September 2019. and finished on 29 January 2020. It was originally scheduled to finish in December 2019 but it was postponed. After many discussions the final matches were played on late January.

Solomon Warriors were crowned as the league champions after winning FC Guadalcanal by default in the last gameweek.

Teams
Nine teams played the 2019–20 season, an increase from eight in the 2018 season. Western United from the previous season did not enter, and were replaced by Isabel United and Laugu United.

FC Guadalcanal (Honiara)
Henderson Eels (Honiara)
Isabel United (Isabel Province) 
Kossa (Honiara)
Laugu United (Honiara)
Malaita Kingz (Malaita)
Marist (Honiara)
Real Kakamora (Makira-Ulawa)
Solomon Warriors (Honiara)

Title Race
Solomon Warriors and Henderson Eels starred a breathtaking title race. Henderson Eels arrived to the last matchweek needing a miracle to win the league as they needed to beat bottom placed team Real Kakamora by 13 or more goals and cheer for a Solomon Warriors loss against FC Guadalcanal. 

Eels won Real Kakamora by 19–0 with eleven goals scored by Raphael Lea'i but Solomon Warriors won Guadalcanal by default to remain with the national league title.

League table

Top scorers

Raphael Lea'i from Henderson Eels was the top scorer of the league with 24 goals scored in seven matches.

References

Solomon Islands S-League seasons
Solomon Islands
Solomon Islands
S-League
S-League